Sculptris is a virtual sculpting software program, with a primary focus on the concept of modeling clay. It entered active development in early December 2009, and the most recent release was in 2011.

Users can pull, push, pinch, and twist virtual clay. It is geared toward character sculpting and "organic" models.

3D meshes (.obj) can be imported into the program for further detailing, generating normal and displacement maps.

In late July 2010, Sculptris inventor Tomas Pettersson joined the Pixologic team (makers of ZBrush), who have taken over Sculptris development. He left Pixologic 'a while' before March 2014.

In June 2020 Pixologic dropped support for Sculptris in favor of ZBrushProMini, a free version of ZBrush that includes Sculptris Pro. As of today, ZBrushProMini is now named ZBrushCoreMini.

Functions
 Sculpting
 Dynamic tessellation
 UV texture painting
 Cavity painting

See also
 Digital sculpting
 ZBrush
 Mudbox
 3D-Coat
 Blender (software)

Footnotes

External links
Download Sculptris from pixologic - registration required
Download Sculptris from ZBrushCentral
Sculptris old forum
Sculptris Version 1.0
Review of Sculptris

3D graphics software
Cross-platform software
2009 software